Pandit Prasad Sawkar (born 14 December 1928) is an Indian vocalist, and scholar of Indian classical, semi-classical, and devotional music. He received prestigious Padma Shri award in the year 2006 for his work in music and Sangeet Natak

Early life and background
Sambaprasad Raghuvir Sawkar was born in Baroda, Gujarat in a family of musicians and actors hailing from Goa. His father, Raghuvir Sawkar, was a singer and actor who was famous for acting a ladies character in the play who was known as Rangdevta. He took his formal education in music and acting from his father. Later he came under the influence of great musicians such as Jitendra Abhisheki and Nivruttibuwa Sarnaik

Career
Sawkar acted as child artist in the play Jinjihun Sutka (जिंजीहून सुटका) as Bal Shivaji at the start of career in Marathi theatre. Later he went to his uncle Dattaram Sawkar for school education at Mhapsa who was also a harmonium player. Sawkar continued getting training of music over there. He played a role of 'Kruttika' in the play "Sanshay Kallol". He also made a record of by playing four characters in the same play namely Kruttika, Sadhu, Singer and Vaishakh Sheth. Later he played in Plays like Soubhadra, Mruchchakatik, Vidyharan, Manapman with "Kala Mandir" organization.

Swakar played important roles with the organization "Natyniketan" in the plays like Rambha, Kulvadhu, Kone eke kali, Ek hota Mhatara, Lagnachi Bedi etc.

He also made career in Marathi Cinema which includes Pedgaoche Shahane, Gora Kumbhar

The period between 1960 and 1972 is known for the revival of Sangeet natak (play) in the industry. Sawkar played a major role in this. He was instrumental by acting in "Panditrao Jagannath" and "Suvarnatula" which get wide popularity. He started getting recognized by popular singer cum actor on the stage with this. In the year 1967, he played the role of "Sadashiv" in the play Katyar kaljat ghusli and worked closely with Purushottam Darvhekar, Jitendra Abhisheki and Vasantrao Deshpande. The song Ghei chand makarand is known as a milestone in the musical plays.

Swakar travelled to United States with his wife in 1972 and played small roles  in his plays over there which also became very popular.

Plays
 Jinjihun Sutka जिंजीहून सुटका
 Sanshay Kallol संशयकल्लोळ
 Soubhadra सौभद्र
 Mruchchakatik मृच्छकटिक
 Vidyharan विद्याहरण
 Manapman मानापमान
 Rambha रंभा (१९५२)
 Kulvadhu कुलवधू
 Kone eke kali कोणे एके काळी
 Lagnachi Bedi एक होता म्हातारा
 Panditrao Jagannath पंडितराज जगन्नाथ 1960
 Suvarnatula सुवर्णतुला 1960
 Mandarmala मंदारमाला 1963
 Jai Jai Gourishankar जय जय गौरीशंकर 1966
 Katyar kaljat ghusli कट्यार काळजात घुसली 1967
 Ghanshyam nayani aala घनश्याम नयनी आला 1968
 To Rajhans Ek तो राजहंस एक 1975
 Amrut mohini अमृत मोहिनी
 Avagha rang ekachi rang अवघा रंग एकचि रंग

Cinema
 Pedgaoche Shahane पेडगावचे शहाणे
 Gora Kumbhar गोरा कुंभार

Popular Songs
	Ghei Chand Makarand घेई छंद मकरंद
	Jai Gange Bhagirathi जय गंगे भागिरथी
	Narayana Ramaramana नारायणा रमारमणा
	Sapt Sur Zankarit Bole सप्त सूर झंकारीत होते
	Utha Pandharichya Raja	ऊठ पंढरीच्या राजा
	Jay Gange Bhagirathi	जय गंगे भागीरथी
	Tare Nahi Ye To Raat Ko	तारे नहीं ये तो रात को
	Narayana Rama Ramana	नारायणा रमा रमणा
	Patit Pavan Naam Aikuni	पतित पावन नाम ऐकुनी
	Priya Na Kavan Tuj	प्रिय न कवण तुज
	Basant Ki Bahar Aayi	बसंत की बहार आयी
	Bujhavo Deep A Sajani	बुझावो दीप ए सजनी
	Bhare Manat Sundara	भरे मनात सुंदरा
	Bhagya Surya Nashuni	भाग्यसूर्य नाशुनि तिमिरा
	Muralidhar Shyam He	मुरलीधर श्याम हे नंदलाल
	Yogi Pavan Manacha	योगी पावन मनाचा
	Ratihun Sundar Madan	रतिहुन सुंदर मदनमंजिरी
	Ragini Mukhachandrama	रागिणी-मुखचंद्रमा
	SaptSur Jhankarit Bole	सप्‍तसूर झंकारित बोले
	Sab Gunijan Mil Gavo	सब गुनिजन मिल गावो
	Savan Ghan Garaje Bajaye	सावन घन गरजे बजाये
	Sukhavito Madhumas Ha	सुखवितो मधुमास हा
	Hi Kanakangi Kon Lalana	ही कनकांगी कोण ललना

Awards and recognitions
 Master Deenanath Mangeshkar Smruti award 
 Jeevan Gourav Award from Maharashtra State Government  
 Panchratna Award 
 Padma Shri

References

Konkani-language singers
1928 births
Hindustani singers
Konkani people
People from North Goa district
Recipients of the Padma Shri in arts
Marathi-language singers
20th-century Indian male classical singers
Living people
Singers from Goa